DJP is the first full length studio album of Filipino teen actor and recording artist Daniel Padilla. It was first released digitally on April 11, 2013 under Star Records. The physical album was launched on April 16, 2013 at the SM North’s The Block.

DJP reached platinum status on April 16, 2013 with over 20,000 copies sold in less than 24 hours, and certified Double Platinum on September 26, 2013. Peaked at number one at Odyssey Music & Video's nationwide sales reports (overall). The album won three awards at three different awarding ceremony including 27th Awit Awards, PMPC Star Awards for Music and MOR Pinoy Music Awards for Best Selling Album of The year, Pop Album of the Year and Album of The Year respectively.

Background
The album followed his 2012 double platinum eponymous debut album Daniel Padilla and his first film in a lead role Must Be... Love.

Composition
The album consists of ten tracks and a bonus track. It also includes an acoustic version of "Nasa Iyo Na Ang Lahat" written by Jungee Marcelo, which Padilla interpreted at the 2013 Himig Handog: P-Pop Love Songs contest and became a popular hit in the Philippines. It also won several awards including MOR Listener’s Choice, Tambayan 101.9 Listener’s Choice, Star Records CD Buyer’s Choice and the MYX Choice for Best Video.

Promotion and reception
The DJP album was launched on April 16, 2013 at the SM North's The Block and made available in various music stores nationwide. According to TV Producer Jinky Fabelico, DJP album turn Platinum in less than 24 hours, this announcement was made through his official Twitter account on April 17, 2013. But according to PARI, this album officially received platinum on September 25, 2013 and the next day received Double Platinum

DJP peaked at number 1 on Odyssey Music & Video’s nationwide sales reports (overall). The album won three awards at three different awarding ceremony for album category, including 27th Awit Awards, PMPC Star Awards for Music and MOR Pinoy Music Awards for Best Selling Album of The year, Pop Album of the Year and Album of The Year respectively.

Mall shows
Padilla held "Grand Fans Day" on May 12, 2013 at SM Skydome to thank his fans for his latest album and concert .

Singles
 "Kamusta Ka" was released on March 18, 2013 as the album's lead single. A lyric video of the song was uploaded on Star Record's YouTube account. It was first appeared in My Music Store Philippines by dominating the Digital Singles Chart for three consecutive weeks in April 2013.

Track listing

Charts

Weekly charts

Release history

Certifications

References

External links
 

Tagalog-language albums
2013 debut albums
Star Music albums
Daniel Padilla albums